Purius superpulverea is a moth in the family Erebidae. It was described by Harrison Gray Dyar Jr. in 1925. It is found in Mexico and southern Texas.

Adults have been recorded on wing in March, October and November.

References

Moths described in 1925
Phaegopterina